Patrick Van Kets (12 December 1966 – 26 September 2022) was a Belgian former professional footballer and manager.

Club career
Van Kets started his professional career with the Belgian side K.R.C. Mechelen, debuting for their senior side in 1988. After spending a season there, he made a move Sint Truidense. Van Kets is best known for his career with Le Mans FC. Playing for the French club between 1993 and 1997, he is one of the top scorer for the Le Mans with 53 goals in four seasons. He was also the second top scorer in Ligue 2 in 1995 and 1996. After leaving Le Mans, he played for one season at Gazélec Ajaccio, the opponent of Le Mans FC for accession to Ligue 2. Van Kets played spent the final season in his career with the French side US Albi, before retiring in 2002.

Managerial career
In 2014, Van Kets was appointed as the manager of the U-21 side of Belgian stint Standard Liège. He returned to his former club Sint Truidense, this time as their assistant manager in 2015.

In 2016, he was appointed as the club's youth academy manager. After spending two seasons with the academy, he signed with the UAE Pro League side Al Ain FC in 2019 as the assistant to Ivan Leko, thus ending his four year association with Sint Truidenese. His next stint was with Belgian First Division A side Waasland-Beveren after signing with them in 2020 as their assistant manager.

On 17 June 2021, Indian Super League club Kerala Blasters appointed Van Kets as their assistant manager to the new boss Ivan Vukomanović. He left the Kerala Blasters camp on 11 October due to a personal emergency.

Death
Van Kets suffered from ALS, a muscle disorder. He died on 26 September 2022.

References

External links
 Patrick Van Kets profile at chamoisfc79.fr

1966 births
2022 deaths
Belgian footballers
Belgian expatriate footballers
Association football forwards
Royal Antwerp F.C. players
Sint-Truidense V.V. players
K. Beerschot V.A.C. players
Le Mans FC players
Chamois Niortais F.C. players
Gazélec Ajaccio players
Red Star F.C. players
Ligue 2 players
Championnat National players
Kerala Blasters FC non-playing staff
People from Duffel
Footballers from Antwerp Province